Gaius Pius Esuvius Tetricus (also Caius) may refer to:
Tetricus I, Emperor of the Gallic Empire from 270/271 to 273
Tetricus II, son of Tetricus I